Washingtonian Hall, also known as Amos Patterson House, is a historic home located in Endwell in Broome County, New York. It is a two-story, five bay, center entrance, frame Federal style house built in 1799–1800.  It was moved a short distance from its original site in 1924 and subsequently remodeled in the Colonial Revival style. Also on the property are contributing structures dating to the mid-1920s including a brick driveway, garden house and pergola. A 1920s carriage barn, horse barn, and picket fence were torn down after suffering severe damage in the 2006 flooding, however historic trim and lightning rods from the carriage house were reclaimed and installed on a new garage built in 2009.

Washingtonian Hall is 4800 square feet with 20 rooms and 4 fireplaces. It overlooks the Susquehanna river. There have been several additions and renovations over the years which retained the federal period architecture, moldings, and Palladian windows. Steam heat and electricity were added in 1924–25. Amos and Ann Patterson purchased 600 acres of land as a part of the Boston Ten Townships for the location of their farm and Washingtonian Hall.

Washingtonian Hall was listed on the National Register of Historic Places in 1996.  The Patterson Hooper family cemetery is also on the National Register.

Below are two recent and two historic pictures of Washingtonian Hall, plus a picture of the Patterson Hooper family cemetery.  

A fun fact: The large Siberian Elm tree behind Washingtonian Hall is the New York State DEC Champion Big Tree of that species!

References

External links

 

Houses in Broome County, New York
Houses completed in 1800
National Register of Historic Places in Broome County, New York
Houses on the National Register of Historic Places in New York (state)
Historic American Buildings Survey in New York (state)
Federal architecture in New York (state)
Colonial Revival architecture in New York (state)